Cranmer Hall is a Church of England theological college based at Durham, England. Cranmer Hall forms part of St John's College, Durham which is a recognised college of Durham University. It stands in the Open Evangelical tradition.

Cranmer Hall currently trains ordinands for the Church of England and the wider Anglican Communion.

History
The college is named after Thomas Cranmer, Archbishop of Canterbury during the reign of Henry VIII.

St John's College, of which Cranmer is one of the two constituent halls, was established in 1909. Having become part of Durham University in 1919, the college was formally divided into the two halls in 1958. Cranmer Hall, the theological training institution and the non-theological John's Hall.

Diversification
The Wesley Study Centre, named after John Wesley, formerly trained ministers for the Methodist Church of Great Britain, but now focuses on postgraduate research.

In October 2015, the college accepted the first students on its Free Church Track, training leaders for churches outside of the Church of England. In October 2016, the college began to train students for Baptist ministry via an alliance with Northern Baptist College, Manchester.

Notable members of staff

 Calvin T. Samuel, Academic Dean and Director of the Wesley Study Centre
 Michael Volland, Director of Mission (2009-2015)

List of wardens
The head of Cranmer Hall is the warden.

1968-1970: John C. P. Cockerton (formerly Chaplain to Cranmer Hall)
1971-1979: Timothy Yeats
1979-1983: Christopher Byworth
1983–1992: Ian Cundy
1993–1996: John Pritchard
1996–2004: Steven Croft
2005–2011: Anne Dyer
2011–2016: Mark Tanner
2017–present: Philip Plyming

Notable alumni

 Arun Arora, former Director of Communications of the Church of England
 Angela Berners-Wilson, first woman ordained a priest in the Church of England
 Steven Croft, Bishop of Oxford
 Chris Edmondson, Bishop of Bolton
 Michael Gear, former Bishop of Doncaster
 John Gladwin, former Bishop of Chelmsford
 Libby Lane, Bishop of Stockport, first woman consecrated a Church of England bishop
 Geoff Pearson, Bishop of Lancaster
 Robert Paterson, Bishop of Sodor and Man
 Joanna Penberthy, first woman consecrated a Church in Wales bishop
 John Saxbee, former Bishop of Lincoln
 Keith Sinclair, Bishop of Birkenhead
 Michael Turnbull, Bishop of Durham (1994–2003)
 Richard Turnbull, Principal of Wycliffe Hall, Oxford
 Justin Welby, Archbishop of Canterbury
 Mark Tanner, Bishop of Berwick

References

External links
 Cranmer Hall website

Bible colleges, seminaries and theological colleges in England
Anglican seminaries and theological colleges
Evangelicalism in the Church of England
Durham University
St John's College, Durham
Anglican buildings and structures in the United Kingdom